Analyta calligrammalis is a species of moth of the family Crambidae.  It is found in Sierra Leone, Ghana, Madagascar, Seychelles as well as in Cameroon, The Gambia, Nigeria, South Africa, and Mali.

Its wingspan is 24–26 mm.

The larvae have been recorded feeding on Ficus species.

References

Spilomelinae
Moths of Africa
Moths of Madagascar
Moths described in 1879